Heike Geissler (born 5 April 1977) is a German author. She is a recipient of the Alfred Döblin Prize.

Life 
Heike Geissler was born in Riesa, Germany, 5 April 1977. She grew up in Riesa and Karl-Marx-Stadt/Chemnitz. In 2001, she received the Alfred Döblin Prize for her novel Rosa, which was published the following year. Her novel Saisonarbeit (2014) was published as Seasonal Associate by Semiotext(e) in English translation by Katy Derbyshire in 2018 to critical acclaim.

She lives in Leipzig.

Awards
2001, Alfred Döblin Prize

Publications 
 Rosa. Roman. Deutsche Verlags-Anstalt, Stuttgart/München 2002, .
 Nichts, was tragisch wäre. Deutsche Verlags-Anstalt, München 2007, .
 Emma und Pferd Beere. With illustrations by Simone Waßermann, Lubok Verlag, Leipzig 2009, .
 Saisonarbeit. Spector Books, Leipzig 2014, .
 English-language translation: Seasonal Associate. Translated Katy Derbyshire. Semiotext(e), New York 2018, .

References

External links 
 
Author homepage
Profile of Heike Geißler, Deutschlandradio Kultur
Review of Seasonal Associate (Saisonarbeit) in the New Yorker (19 November 2018)

1977 births
Living people
21st-century German writers
21st-century German women writers
People from Riesa